Neighborhood is a role-playing game published by Wheaton Publications in 1982.

Description
Neighborhood is a childhood system (i.e., a game about being a kid). It consists of the every day struggles of children in suburban neighbourhoods.

Publication history
Neighborhood was published by Wheaton Publications in 1982.

Reception

References

Comedy role-playing games
Role-playing games introduced in 1982